David North (born 24 March 1956) is justice of the Supreme Court of Queensland in the Trial Division. He took silk in 1996, and is an alum of the law program at the University of Queensland.

References

Judges of the Supreme Court of Queensland
Living people
1956 births
Place of birth missing (living people)
University of Queensland alumni